is a public holiday in Japan held annually on November 3 for the purpose of promoting culture, the arts, and academic endeavor. Festivities typically include art exhibitions, parades, and award ceremonies for distinguished artists and scholars.

History

Culture Day was first held in 1948, to commemorate the announcement of the post-war Japanese constitution on November 3, 1946.

November 3 was first celebrated as a national holiday in 1868, when it was called , a holiday held in honor of the birthday of the reigning Emperor—at that time, Emperor Meiji (see also The Emperor's Birthday). This was subsequently discontinued with the announcement of Culture Day in 1948.

Current practice

As Culture Day exists to promote the arts and various fields of academic endeavor, local and prefectural governments typically choose this day to hold art exhibits, culture festivals, and parades.  For example, Hakone in Kanagawa Prefecture holds the annual  to exhibit Edo period clothing and costumes. Primary and secondary schools often have a "culture festival" on or near this day.

Since 1936, the award ceremony for the prestigious Order of Culture has been held on this day. Given by the Emperor himself to those who have significantly advanced science, the arts or culture, it is one of the highest honours bestowed by the Imperial Family.  The prize is not restricted to Japanese citizens, and for instance was awarded to the Apollo 11 astronauts upon their successful return from the moon, as well as literary scholar Donald Keene.

Events
The Order of Culture is held at the Tokyo Imperial Palace.
The Japan Maritime Self-Defense Force will decorate the self-defense ships moored at bases and general ports.
An art festival sponsored by the Agency for Cultural Affairs is held around Culture Day.
Some museums and galleries offer free admission and various events.
The All Japan Kendo Championship, held at the Nippon Budokan, is broadcast live on NHK General TV.

In addition, this day is considered to be a "sunny day" with a high probability of sunny weather.
It is statistically one of the clearest days of the year.
Between 1965 and 1996, there were only three years with rain occurring in Tokyo on Culture Day.

References

Public holidays in Japan
Festivals in Japan
November observances
Emperor Meiji